is the highest score a fighter can achieve in a Japanese martial arts ippon-wazari contest, usually kendo, judo, karate or jujitsu.

In Judo

In Judo, an ippon may be scored for a throw, a pin, a choke or a jointlock.
For throws, the four criteria to grant an ippon are: speed, force, landing on the back and skilful control until
the end of the landing. For pinning techniques, the pin must be held continually for 20 seconds. For chokes and locks, ippon is scored when the opponent gives up or is incapacitated.
Two consecutive waza-ari by the same athlete also add up to an ippon (waza-ari awasete ippon).
An ippon in judo is often compared to a knockout punch in boxing.

In karate
In shobu ippon kumite, a method of karate competition, an ippon is awarded for a technique judged as decisive. This is usually a move that connects cleanly, with good form and with little opportunity for the opponent to defend against it. Kicks to the head of an opponent or judo throws followed up with a strike to the downed opponent are particularly likely to be considered a winning ippon technique. A competitor is declared the winner upon achieving a judgment of ippon.

Occasionally, shobu nihon kumite is used, in which two decisive strikes (or four less-decisive strikes, scored as waza-ari) are required for a win. In many tournaments, sanbon scoring is used. This promotes a flashier style of fighting more suited to a spectator sport. More traditional tournaments usually use ippon scoring.

See also
 Waza-ari
 Ippon seoi nage

References

External links

 Ippon on Judopedia
 Ippon gachi on Judo-Channel

Japanese martial arts terminology